Lerești is a commune in Argeș County, Muntenia, Romania. It is composed of three villages: Lerești, Pojorâta and Voinești.

Natives
 Vasile Milea

References

Communes in Argeș County
Localities in Muntenia